Tyrone Smith (born 12 July 1983) is an Australian-Tongan professional rugby union and rugby league footballer. He is currently signed to the French Rugby Pro D2 team RC Narbonne. Smith previously played Super Rugby with the Brumbies and Super League with the London Broncos/Harlequins RL.

Early life
Smith was born in Manly, New South Wales. He played his early rugby in the union code, touring the UK in 2002 with the Australian Schoolboys team. He is the younger brother of Australian Wallaby flanker George Smith.

Career

Rugby League

In 2002, Smith switched to rugby league to play with the Sydney Roosters and was part of the winning junior side in the Jersey Flegg premiership. Graduating to NSWRL Premier League, he scored a try in the Roosters' 30–8 win over St George-Illawarra in the 2004 Premier League grand final.
Smith signed with the London Broncos (later renamed Harlequins RL) in 2004 to play in the Super League. In 2005 he made his international début for Tonga against Samoa in Sydney and scored two tries in their 34–20 win.

Rugby Union

In 2008, Smith agreed a two-year deal with the Brumbies to switch to rugby union and join his older brother George Smith playing in the Super Rugby competition. He earned 47 caps for the Brumbies between 2008 and 2011.

Later in 2011, he moved to Japan to play for the Honda Heat in the 2011–12 Top League season. In June 2013, he signed a two-year deal with French Pro D2 team RC Narbonne.

After retiring from professional rugby, he moved to work as a rugby coach at Sydney Grammar school.

Reference list

External links

1983 births
Australian expatriate rugby union players
Australian expatriate sportspeople in England
Australian sportspeople of Tongan descent
Barbarian F.C. players
ACT Brumbies players
Expatriate rugby league players in England
Expatriate rugby union players in England
Mie Honda Heat players
Living people
London Broncos players
People from Manly, New South Wales
Rugby league wingers
Rugby union centres
Australian expatriate sportspeople in France